Osen may refer to:

People
Erwin Dom Osen (1891–1970), an Austrian mime artist
Otto Osen (1882–1950), a Norwegian long-distance runner

Places

Bulgaria

Osen, Silistra Province, a village in the Glavinitsa municipality, Silistra Province
Osen, Targovishte Province, a village in the Targovishte municipality, Targovishte Province
Osen, Vratsa Province, a village in the Krivodol municipality, Vratsa Province

Norway
Osen, a municipality in Trøndelag
Osen Church, a church in Osen municipality in Trøndelag
Nordre Osen, a village in Åmot municipality in Hedmark

Russia
Osen (river), a tributary of the Mologa

See also
Osan, a city in Gyeonggi Province in South Korea